Anjum Rajabali is a veteran Indian screenwriter and teacher. He has written films like Drohkaal (1994), Ghulam (1998), The Legend of Bhagat Singh (2002) and Raajneeti (2010). He is also known for his leadership and lobbying for the rights of Indian screenwriters, as a senior activist of the Screenwriters Association, India.

Career
He did his schooling from Rashtriya Military School Belgaum and began his career in the film industry as an associate scriptwriter for the critically acclaimed Drohkaal (1994). In 1998, Anjum wrote the screenplay for the film China Gate along with writing the story and screenplay for the hit crime-thriller Ghulam, starring Aamir Khan and Rani Mukherji. In the following years, Anjum is credited with writing for films across a variety of genres, including the action film Kachche Dhaage (1999), the drama Pukar (2000), the biographical film The Legend of Bhagat Singh (2002) and the horror Naina (2005). He was the script consultant on Prakash Jha's crime-drama Apaharan (2005) and Anjum's association with him extended for the next four successive films that Prakash Jha directed, with Anjum writing for Raajneeti (2010), Aarakshan (2011), Chakravyuh and his latest release Satyagraha (2013).

He is the Head of Screenwriting at Whistling Woods as well as the Honorary Head of Screenplay Writing at the Film and Television Institute of India (FTII), a course that he founded in 2004. Apart from being a script consultant on several films, he also conducts workshops, seminars and conferences on screenwriting. In mid-2014, he joined with Mumbai Mantra as Convenor for their new initiative, the Mumbai Mantra CineRise Screenwriting Programme - 100 Storytellers A Year - a process of nurturing screenwriting talent, planned with 8 defined stages of creative intervention, which invited applications from Indian screenwriters from any part of the world, including non-resident Indians and even those with mixed Indian parentage.

Filmography

Writer

Script Consultant

Actor

Producer
Private Detective: Two Plus Two Plus One (2010) (executive producer)

Thanks
 Int. Cafe Night (2014) (Special thanks)
 Hrid Majharey (2014) (Special thanks)
 Rab da Vaasta... (2013) (Thanks) 
 Dum Maaro Dum (2011) (Acknowledgment) 
 Turning 30 (2011) (Acknowledgment) 
 Der Andher (2011) (Very special thanks)  
 Read My Silence (2011) (Special thanks)  
 Via Kargil (2011) (Special thanks)
 Khakee (2004) (Acknowledgment - as Mr. Anjum Rajabali)   
 Sarfarosh (1999) (Grateful thanks - as Shri. Anjum Rajaballi)
 Godmother (1999) (Acknowledgment)

Miscellaneous crew
Valmiki Ki Bandook (2010) (Script supervisor)
Mulk   (Script supervisor)

References

External links 
 

Living people
Indian male film actors
Indian male screenwriters
Savitribai Phule Pune University alumni
1958 births
20th-century Indian male actors
20th-century Indian dramatists and playwrights
21st-century Indian dramatists and playwrights
People from Bhavnagar district
Screenwriters from Mumbai
Male actors from Mumbai
20th-century Indian male writers
21st-century Indian male writers